= Michael Tolmach =

American business executive

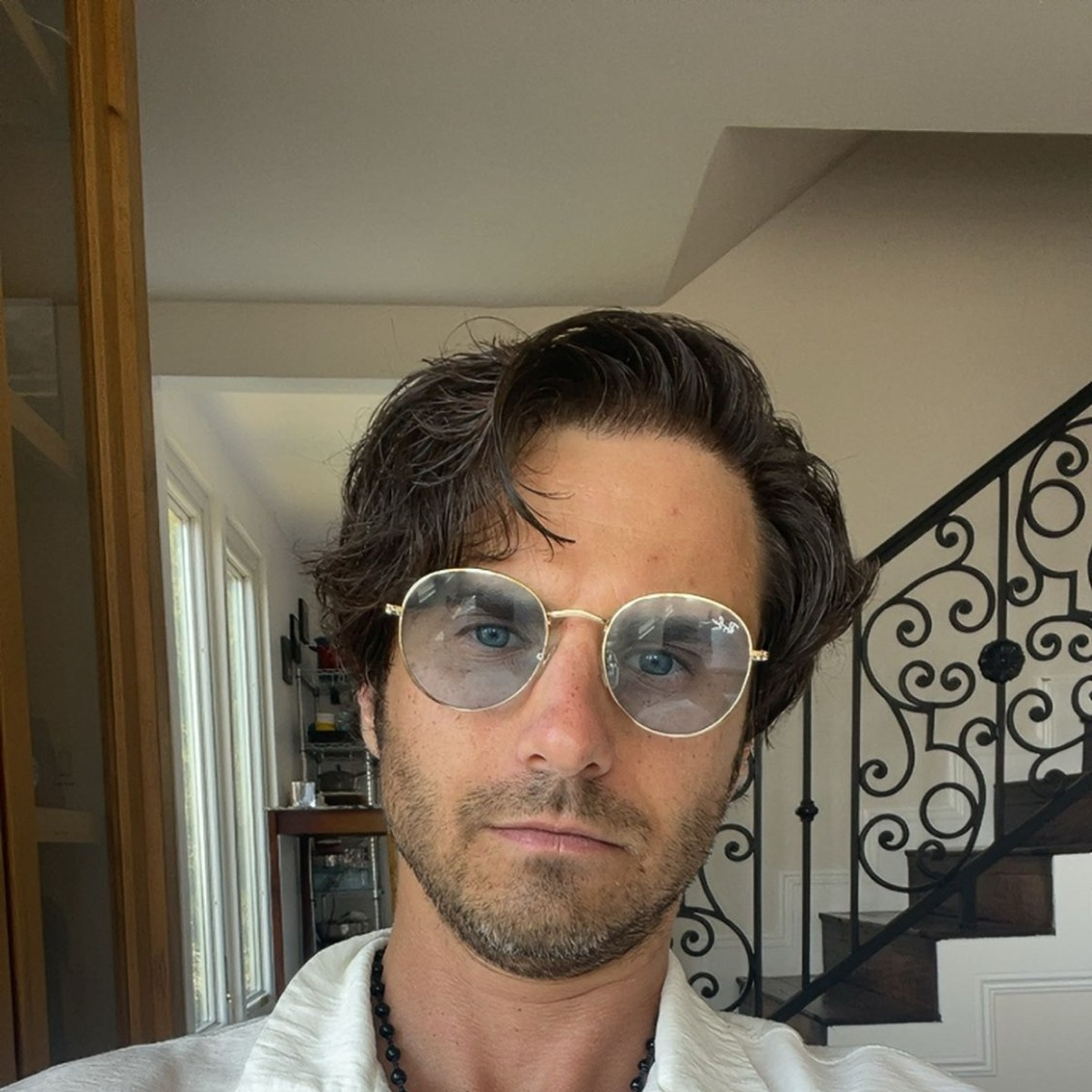
- Education: Bronx High School of Science; Baruch College
- Occupation: Businessman
- Known for: Co-founder of Eonsmoke

Michael Tolmach (born 1986) is an American businessperson who is best known as the co-founder and former chief executive officer of Eonsmoke, an electronic cigarette company.

== Early life and education ==
Tolmach was born in 1986. He is a graduate of Baruch College and Bronx High School of Science.

== Career ==
In 2011, Tolmach co-founded Eonsmoke, an electronic cigarette company with Gregory Grishayev. During his tenure as the CEO, Eonsmoke revenues increased from $2.3 million in 2017 to $90 million in 2019.

Tolmach was named in litigation involving Eonsmoke's 4X Pods products and their marketing. In December 2021, Massachusetts announced a settlement with Eonsmoke, Gregory Grishayev, and Tolmach resolving allegations that the company had targeted young people in the marketing and sale of vaping products. Eonsmoke closed its operations in April 2020 after Grishayev and Tolmach agreed to pay a combined $750,000 as part of a broader $50 million settlement.
